Odo Fusi Pecci, (29 June 1920 – 20 March 2016) was an Italian prelate of the Roman Catholic Church. Fusi Pecci was born in Cingoli, Italy, and was ordained a priest on 19 December 1942. He was appointed Bishop of the Diocese of Senigallia on 15 July 1971, where he would remain until his retirement on 21 January 1997. He died in March 2016.

References

External links
Catholic-Hierarchy
Diocese of Senigallia Website

1920 births
2016 deaths
20th-century Italian Roman Catholic bishops